Jimmy Walker (1941- July 16, 2020) was an American musician, who was the drummer for one-hit wonder band The Knickerbockers and the replacement for Bill Medley in the Righteous Brothers, following his 1968 departure.

Early life 
Born in The Bronx, New York, Walker learned the drums when he was around seven or eight. His first group was in New York called The Castle Kings. They had signed to Atlantic Records after Ahmet Ertegun, the then president of the company, heard them.

The Knickerbockers 
Walker rose to prominence in 1965 as the drummer for the New Jersey based group, The Knickerbockers, consisting of brothers John and Beau Charles (guitar and bass), and Buddy Randall (previously of the Royal Teens fame/lead vocals). He first heard of them after hearing them play in 1964:

They had a number 20 charting hit with “Lies”. Lies stood out due to its Beatles-esque sound. The Knickerbockers would become regulars on Dick Clark's Where The Action Is.

With a few more hits such as “One Track Mind”, “My Feet Are Off The Ground”, and a cover of Tom Jones’ “It's Not Unusual” (which featured Jimmy on lead vocals), none of them could match the popularity of “Lies”, and Walker left the band in 1967. He reappeared with the group for two reunions in 1983 and 1990.

The Righteous Brothers 
In February 1968, Bill Medley of the Righteous Brothers, left to duo to peruse a solo career. Walker would fill in Medley's place as the new righteous brother, from 1968 to 1971. As the Righteous Brothers, Walker and Bobby Hatfield released one album, Re-Birth (1969), which Walker also co-produced.

Walker remained in the duo until their three-year hiatus in 1971. They reformed in 1974, with the original duo of Medley and Hatfield.

Later career 
Walker recorded three solo singles for Columbia Records between 1968 and 1969, before retiring to Wyoming in the 1970s. Walker would continue to perform with “The Jimmy Walker Band”.

Death 
Walker died on July 16, 2020, aged 79.

Discography

The Knickerbockers

Singles 

 "All I Need is You" / "Bite Bite Barracuda" (1964)
 "Jerktown" / "Room for One More" (1965)
 "Lies" / "The Coming Generation" (1965)
 "One Track Mind" / "I Must Be Doing Something Right" (1966)
 "High on Love" / "Stick With Me" (1966)
 "Chapel in the Fields" / "Just One Girl" (1966)
 "Love is a Bird" / "Rumors, Gossip, Words Untrue" (1966)
 "Please Don't Love Him" / "Can You Help Me" (1966)
 "What Does That Make You?" / "Sweet Green Fields" (1967)
 "Come and Get It" / "Wishful Thinking" (1967)
 "I Can Do It Better" / "You'll Never Walk Alone" (1967)

EPs 

 "Lies" / "The Coming Generation" / "One Track Mind" / "I Must Be Doing Something Right" (London 10178) 1966

Albums 

 Lloyd Thaxton Presents.... (Challenge 1264) 1965
 Jerk & Twine Time (Challenge 621) 1966

The Righteous Brothers

Albums 

 Re-Birth (1969)

References 

1941 births
2020 deaths
American singers
American drummers
American musicians
People from the Bronx